The Dispatch Broadcast Group was a media company based in Columbus, Ohio. The group was a division of the Dispatch Printing Company, former owner of the Columbus Dispatch, and was owned by the Wolfe family since 1929 until its sale to Tegna Inc. in mid-2019. The Dispatch Broadcast Group included the WBNS television (CBS-affiliate WBNS-TV) and radio (WBNS (AM) and WBNS-FM) stations in Columbus, the Ohio News Network, and NBC-affiliate WTHR television in Indianapolis formerly (WLW-I) which was purchased in 1975.

On April 24, 2013, former WBNS-TV news director John Cardenas was named president and general manager of the station and vice president of broadcast news for the Dispatch Broadcast Group. On December 7, 2018, Dispatch Broadcast Group president and WTHR general manager Larry Delia commented to the Indianapolis Business Journal that the company may consider buying divested Nexstar Media Group stations as Nexstar readies to buy Tribune Media.

On June 11, 2019, it was reported the Dispatch Broadcast Group had sold its television and radio assets to Tegna Inc. for the sale price of $535 million. The sale was completed on August 8.

References

Tegna Inc.
Defunct broadcasting companies of the United States
Companies based in the Columbus, Ohio metropolitan area
1929 establishments in Ohio
Mass media companies disestablished in 2019
2019 disestablishments in Ohio
2019 mergers and acquisitions